Hosackia crassifolia, synonym Lotus crassifolius, is a species of legume native to Washington, California and Oregon. It is known by the common names big deervetch and broad-leafed lotus.

Distribution
The plant is native to western North America, in California, Oregon, and Washington (U.S. states); and into Baja California (Méxican state).

The California populations are found in diverse habitats, including chaparral, California oak woodland, California mixed evergreen forest, and conifer forest.

Description
Hosackia crassifolia is a long-lived, somewhat bushy plant which bears long straight stems with evenly spaced oval-shaped leaves.

It produces thick bunches of yellow, pink-and-yellow, or scarlet-and-yellow pea flowers. The bloom period is May to August.

The brownish pea pods contain speckled red or brown peas.

Varieties
Hosackia crassifolia var. crassifolia — broad-leafed lotus (formerly Lotus crassifolius var. crassifolius).
Hosackia crassifolia var. otayensis — Otay Mountain lotus, Otay Mountain hosackia (formerly Lotus crassifolius var. otayensis), endemic to Otay Mountain in the San Ysidro Mountains of San Diego County, California. It is a critically endangered species.

References

External links
 Calflora: Hosackia crassifolia (Broad leaved lotus) — formerly Lotus crassifolius.
Jepson Manual eFlora (YJM2) treatment of Hosackia crassifolia — formerly Lotus crassifolius.
 USDA Plants Profile for Lotus crassifolius (big deervetch)
UC Photos gallery of Hosackia crassifolia — formerly Lotus crassifolius.

crassifolia
Flora of California
Flora of Baja California
Flora of Oregon
Flora of Washington (state)
Flora of the Cascade Range
Flora of the Klamath Mountains
Flora of the Sierra Nevada (United States)
Natural history of the California chaparral and woodlands
Natural history of the California Coast Ranges
Natural history of the Peninsular Ranges
Natural history of the Transverse Ranges
San Ysidro Mountains
Taxa named by George Bentham
Flora without expected TNC conservation status